Max McCalman is an American cheese expert. He is an author, was the first Maître Fromager in a North American restaurant, spearheaded the creation of the Artisanal Bistro and Artisanal Premium Cheese Center, and is an advocate for raw-milk cheeses.

McCalman travels throughout the country and world to judge at cheese competitions, consult cheesemakers and retailers, as well as guide European tours for cheese professionals and enthusiasts. Some of his judging appearances include the following. Besides being a recurring judge at the annual American Cheese Society Conferences, he was instrumental in the founding of the ACS Certified Cheese Professional Endeavor. McCalman is currently a Member of the ACS board of directors.

He currently resides in Brooklyn, NY.

Education

After graduating from Hendrix College, McCalman's career path led him into the hotel and hospitality industry. Here he started learning about fine wines and after stints in Arkansas, Texas, and New Jersey, he became Maître d'Hotel at the New York Hilton in 1988.

He kept on building his wine acumen and in 1990 became the general manager of Manhattan's The Water Club. He remained there until the birth of his daughter in 1992, which led to his decision to become a full-time father for two years. He then joined Picholine Restaurant as Maître d'Hotel and, along with Terrance Brennan, launched its cheese service in 1995. He spearheaded the installment of the first temperature and humidity controlled cheese cave in a North American restaurant in late 1995, making him one of the trailblazers of a then almost unexplored cheese world.

Works 
During the early 2000s McCalman started authoring his first of four books, The Cheese Plate. At around the same time he was an essential part in the planning and designing of the Artisanal Bistro. After the opening of the Bistro, McCalman started work on his second book, Cheese – A Connoisseur's Guide to the World's Best. Due to the enormous growth in demand for artisan cheese, the Artisanal Premium Cheese Center was founded in 2002. Here McCalman worked in the capacity of Maître Fromager and Dean of Curriculum and was integral to the planning and operating of the enterprise. He remained in these roles until 2014, when he decided to separate himself from the Center and focus his attention on the creative side of his work. Under his new company, MAXVOL, Inc., he is now teaching classes, hosting corporate and private events, writing articles, authoring books, and guest speaking around the country as an often called-upon expert for all matters cheese. The topics McCalman talks about include affinage, cheese and beverage pairings, cheese making, food safety, nutrition, as well as transportation and storage, amongst many others. Besides all topics cheese, McCalman is also an authority on the art of discovering the perfect wine and cheese pairings.

McCalman has been a driving force behind the creation of the official certification program of the American Cheese Society and has been the Chairman of the Certified Cheese Professional Committee since 2012.

In the spring of 2015, McCalman joined the Institute of Culinary Education faculty as Director of Cheese Studies and will begin teaching courses in June.

During the American Cheese Society Conference 2016 in Des Moines, IA, McCalman was appointed to the American Cheese Society board of directors.

Personal life
McCalman was born in Louisville, Kentucky, but spent his childhood living in Brazil. He still has strong ties to Brazil and says that his knack for languages comes from the early exposure to Portuguese. McCalman has proficient conversational knowledge in six languages.

In May 2015 McCalman took his successful Swatchbook digital and launched his first cheese and wine pairing app on the App Store.

Awards and honors
 The Cheese Plate was nominated for both IACP and James Beard Awards in 2002.
 Cheese: A Connoisseur's Guide to the World's Best was awarded a James Beard Award in 2006.
 His book Mastering Cheese won Best Cheese Book in the World at Gourmand Cookbook Awards, Paris in 2010.
 In 2010, the French Food Spirit Awards honored McCalman with the Entrepreneurship Award, in recognition of his work at Picholine.
 McCalman was awarded the Odyssey Medal from his alma mater, Hendrix College, in 2011.
 In 2013 McCalman was officially awarded the title of Maître Fromager by the Guilde Internationale des Fromagers Confrérie de Saint-Uguzon.
 The Confraria do Vinho do Porto elevated McCalman to the rank of Cavaleiro on November 10, 2014.
 The American Cheese Society awarded McCalman with the Honorary Certified Cheese Professional title in 2015.
 McCalman became the Director of Cheese Studies at the Institute of Culinary Education.
 McCalman was appointed to the board of directors of the American Cheese Society in the summer of 2016.

Books and publications
 The Cheese Plate
 Cheese: A Connoisseur's Guide to the World's Best
 Mastering Cheese
 Max McCalman's Wine and Cheese Pairing Swatchbook: 50 Matches to Delight Your Palate

References

Cheesemakers
Hendrix College alumni
Year of birth missing (living people)
Living people
American male writers
People from Brooklyn
Writers from Louisville, Kentucky